Reverend John de la Poer Beresford, 4th Marquess of Waterford (27 April 1814 – 6 November 1866) was an Irish peer and Church of Ireland minister.

Beresford was the third son of the Henry Beresford, 2nd Marquess of Waterford and his wife, Susanna. He was educated at Eton and Trinity College, Cambridge. He later entered the ministry and was the incumbent of Mullaghbrack, County Armagh and a Prebendary of St Patrick's Cathedral, serving under his uncle, Lord John.

On 20 February 1843, he married Christiana Leslie, daughter of Charles Powell Leslie II. They had five sons:

John Henry de la Poer, Earl of Tyrone, later 5th Marquess of Waterford (1844–1895)
Lord Charles William de la Poer (1846–1919), later created Baron Beresford, naval commander
Lord William Leslie de la Poer (1847–1900), soldier
Lord Marcus Talbot de la Poer (1848–1922), equerry
Lord Delaval James de la Poer (1862–1906), soldier

Death

Beresford inherited the marquessate from his childless brother in 1859. On his own death in 1866, the title passed to his eldest son, John.

References

Ordained peers
1814 births
1866 deaths
People educated at Eton College
John
4